Bulan, officially the Municipality of Bulan,  is a 1st class municipality in the province of Sorsogon, Philippines. According to the 2020 census, it has a population of 105,190 people, making it the most populated town in the province.

Geography

The Municipality of Bulan is located at the south-westernmost tip of the Bicol Peninsula of the island of Luzon. It has an area of exactly 20,094 hectares and is the terminal and burgeoning center of trade and commerce of its neighboring towns. It comprises fifty-five (55) barangays and eight (8) zones and is populated by people of diversified origin.

This municipality is bounded on the north by the Municipality of Magallanes, on the east by the municipalities of Juban and Irosin, on the south by the Municipality of Matnog, and on the west by Ticao Pass.

Barangays

Bulan is politically subdivided into 63 barangays.

Climate

Demographics

Economy

One of Bicol's fastest growing economy and primed to be the next city of Sorsogon. Bulan now is being groomed to be the next city of the province given its being a first class municipality with an estimated population of 120k, 196 square kilometers land area and an annual regular income of not less than P200M Bulan almost had the status of being a city. 

Residents of Bulan are now looking forward to its city hood because of its rapid-economic growth considering the fact that it is cited as the richest municipality in the province and 5th among the 1st class municipalities in Bicol Region with an average annual income of PHP 58.8M. If it happens, Bulan will be the second city in the province and will be the 8th in the region.

Major exports of this town are from its coastal waters, agricultural lands produce rice, copra, abaca fiber. Most of the revenues come from the fishing port of Bulan and businesses.

There are three commercial banks in Bulan, the PNB (with 2 ATMs), BDO Network Bank (The first commercial proper bank in the area with 2 storey and atm services.), and the Landbank of the Philippines, A rural bank Rural Bank of San Jacinto, Masbate, Rural Bank of Pilar, Sorsogon, Camalig Bank, and the Producer's Bank. A BDO Unibank Bulan branch is expected to be built soon. There are also lending institutions like Intertrade, GSAC, and PALFSI that are very popular to SMEs.

Development areas 

Due to Bulan's rapidly growing economy and revenue, alongside its large population growth, the old and unfinished Bulan airport will start construction soon and will serve as the gateway to the province of Sorsogon.

Bulan port also will undergo rehabilitation so locals would not have to go to Matnog to access the Visayas and Masbate Area.

Shopping centers 
There are two main shopping centers in the town: the LCC Supermarket and Department Store and Jeanee's Supermarket and Department Store. PureGold has been planned and will build in the future. And soon to open in 2023, the new LCC Market Savers. This will be the second LCC in the town to be expanded.

There are local and national retail chains that the town has drawn in addition to the numerous shops already present in the downtown area, including 7-Eleven and Mr. DIY.

Food chains 

There are many local restaurants in the town; Bentornato Restaurant, Dragon House Restaurant, Mama Vacion's Bar & Grill, Lola Feling Restobar, El Jardin Restobar, Ning's Restaurant, Maskinano Kitchen & Bar, Sunray's 101 Fudhub, Saddle Ranch Sizzling and Steakhouse, Bird Box, Paborito Grill, Francis Burgers, Aroz Frito ni Tata Kanor, also the Samgyup sa Bulan, Inasal Pampanga's Bezt- Bulan branch and many more.

The town also has Jollibee Bulan, and De Oro Barbeque King Bulan (BBQ King). McDonald's, KFC and Seoul 199 have planned and will build in the future.

Growth 

Although poverty is still high in Bulan the government had improve people's lives. Bulan is ranked in the Top 10 richest municipalities in the Bicol Region and the 5th fastest growing after Daet and Daraga, Albay.

Infrastracture

Telecommunications 
Bulan has fixed landline phones and fiber internet from BTTI (Bicol Telephone and Telegraph, Inc.) and PLDT. Mobile or cellular networks are Globe, Smart and Dito Telecommunications Companies.

Education

Primary education 
The primary education in Bulan is divided into two Districts, the Bulan North District comprising all the Barangays towards the north coastal Barangays, to the interior land locked northern Barangays. The Bulan South District comprises the southern Coastal Barangays.

Secondary education 
Bulan has many secondary educational institutions. The largest public high school is Bulan National High School. Formerly, it was the Bulan High School/Bulan Vocational High School, before the former was converted into Sorsogon State College Bulan Campus. BNHS has satellite Campuses at Barangays Otavi, Beguin, J.P. Laurel, San Juan Bag-o. There is also a Secondary School in San Francisco, one of the biggest Barangay of Bulan. The San Francisco National High School.
On the coastal area, Quezon National High School, is one and only coastal high school in the area. Where students from nearby barangays (Osmeña, Aguinaldo, Sagrada and even Coron-Coron & Sua - part of Municipality of Matnog, use to send their students. The only school to represent major national events as headed by Mrs. Adelia O. Gregorio (Principal), Mr. Renato B. Gallenito and their co-teachers (by: HBF).

There are various private secondary schools. The St. Louise De Marillac School (Formerly Colegio de la Inmaculada Concepcion) a Catholic school run by the Daughters of Charity religious congregation, Immaculate Conception Academy of Bulan (Formerly Immaculate Conception Learning Center) a Catholic School, Saint Bonaventure Academy of Butag, the Southern Luzon Institute-Kenerino Ramirez Asuncion Memorial School (SLI-KRAMS) were the oldest school in Bulan, Solis Institute of Technology, and A.G. Villaroya Technological Foundation Institute.

Tertiary education 
Sorsogon State University - Bulan Campus
 R.G. De Castro Colleges (formerly Quezon Academy)
SLI-KRAMS
Solis Institute of Technology
A.G. Villaroya (Post-Secondary courses only)

Alternative Learning System 
Aside from the formal education system, a parallel alternative learning system program is incorporated in the education system to provide a viable alternative to the existing formal education structure. It encompasses both the non-formal and informal sources of knowledge and skills such as those acquired at home, the church, media, environment or even the life itself and span the pre-literacy to higher skills continuum.

There are two major existing programs implemented. 1) Basic Literacy Program 2)Accreditation and Equivalency (A & E). ALS implementers such as Mobile Teachers and District ALS Coordinators were the one administer the implementation of the programs. It is intended for Out-of-School Youth and Adults who are unschooled or school drop-out. For more inquiries look for Bulan South and Bulan North Districts ALS implementers.

References

External links
 Bulan Profile at PhilAtlas.com
 [ Philippine Standard Geographic Code]
 Philippine Census Information
 Local Governance Performance Management System
 LGU Profile of Bulan,Sorsogon

Municipalities of Sorsogon